Pas Kalayeh-ye Bozorg (also Romanized as Pas Kalāyeh-ye Bozorg; also known as Pas Kalāyeh) is a village in Baladeh Rural District, Khorramabad District, Tonekabon County, Mazandaran Province, Iran. At the 2006 census, its population was 1,196, in 330 families.

References 

Populated places in Tonekabon County